Carmen Beth Twillie (born April 8, 1950) is an American actress and singer. She is a longtime friend of Tommy Morgan and has appeared as guest contralto soloist with Morgan's choir. She is best known for singing the Elton John and Tim Rice song "Circle of Life" in the beginning of the 1994 Disney animated feature film The Lion King. She provided the singing voice of Stormella in the 1998 Christmas animated film Rudolph the Red-Nosed Reindeer: The Movie and she was a singer in the 1997 animated film Cats Don't Dance. She does a few of small voice roles in the 1993 stop-motion animated film The Nightmare Before Christmas as the Undersea Gal and the Creature under the bed. She also appeared on the Chowder episode "Sing Beans" doing one of the voices for the sing beans alongside voice actors Jess Harnell, John DiMaggio, and Tara Strong.

She also is a backup singer, having appeared on several albums released by artists such as Celine Dion, Whitney Houston, Dionne Warwick and Pink Floyd for their 1987 album A Momentary Lapse of Reason.

References

External links
 
 

1950 births
Living people
American film actresses
American television actresses
African-American actresses
American voice actresses
20th-century African-American women singers
American contraltos
21st-century African-American people
21st-century African-American women